Webkinz is a stuffed animal franchise by the Canadian toy company Ganz. The merchandise consists of stuffed animals that have online counterparts in the video games "Webkinz Classic" and "Webkinz Next". It was originally released by Ganz on April 29, 2005. 

Each Webkinz toy has an attached tag with a unique "secret code" printed on it, allowing its owner to play with their pet on iOS, Android, and desktop computers. Plush toys sold after 2019 contain two secret codes: one eight-digit code compatible with "Webkinz Classic", and one 15-digit code compatible with "Webkinz Next".

In Webkinz World, the secret code allows the user to own a virtual version of their pet for online play. Sales of Webkinz plush toys are limited to the United States and Canada, but international users can buy virtual pets from the Ganz eStore.

In 2006, Webkinz Classic achieved one million concurrent players. During this same year, according to one estimate published in Wired, Webkinz generated approximately $100 million in revenue. In 2011, Ganz produced its first television advertisements for Webkinz Classic. Ganz updated Webkinz Classic in 2015 to Webkinz X, a version that created a safer environment for young players. October 2020, Ganz unveiled Webkinz Next, a 3D spin-off with different social features, giving players the option between Webkinz Classic and Webkinz Next.

Types of Webkinz
 
There are many types of Webkinz, such as: regular pets, wild animals, prehistoric animals, and mythical creatures. Along with the regular Webkinz toys, there are also smaller, less expensive versions called Lil' Kinz, as well as larger, more expensive versions in the signature collection, which ran from April 2009 to December 2013.  

In May 2009, the Birthstone Pets series was released, in which one new Birthstone Pet was released every month. In April 2010, Ganz replaced the Birthstone Pets series with the Zodiac Pets series. Similarly, one Zodiac Pet was released every month. In 2011, the CandyKinz series was released. In June 2012, the Rockerz Pets series was released. 

In 2019, Ganz announced that the “first generation” of Webkinz plush was ending and that no new plush pets would be released for the time being. Website operations would continue, and purely virtual pets could still be purchased. In November 2020, two new Webkinz plush pets were released, starting a "new generation" of pets. These new pets include two codes, one for Webkinz Classic and one for Webkinz Next.

Gameplay 

Each Webkinz stuffed animal and Webkinz accessory comes with an 8-character code, within a tag tied usually on the doll's frontmost right appendage. By registering this code on the Webkinz Classic desktop application or mobile app, the customer "adopts" a pet in the virtual Webkinz World. Without the code, the user will not get access to the full Webkinz World, but they can create a free account. On January 19, 2011, Ganz announced that Webkinz World accounts would no longer expire, meaning users would not have to buy a new pet each year to renew their account. However, certain elements and other features are limited with a free account. Young adults who had active accounts on the website have even revisited their pets to catch up on their health as an online trend.

The Webkinz World is an online play area with its own economy controlled by Ganz. The user receives money (called KinzCash) by adopting new pets, playing online games, answering general knowledge questions, and through daily activities like clicking "I love my Webkinz!", spinning the Wheel of WOW, playing Wishing Well 2, or completing jobs (minigames) available once every 8 hours. Each day, there is a Game of the Day which can be played for bonus KinzCash, and other bonuses are available each hour, full days on weekends, and afternoons only on weekdays. With each Webkinz toy purchased, more KinzCash, rooms, and items are added to the user's account. There is also an arcade, where the user can play games to earn trophies and KinzCash.

Many of the tasks in Webkinz World involve collecting items. For example, recipes are released for the players through cookbooks or one of the TV shows called The Secret Chef. "Gems" can be mined once a day at the Curio Shop, with a full set of gems being turned into the Webkinz Crown of Wonder and used to buy exclusive items. A similar feature, called Alyssa's Star Challenge, involves users clicking on colored stars to find valuable stars.

The online world also contains many rare or exclusive items. Some of these items require developing a friendship with the Curio Shop owner to purchase, while others are obtained by registering other Webkinz accessories purchased in the real world. Each type of pet gets a special item and food available exclusively for them. Also, a "Pet of the Month" is announced at the beginning of each month. If a person registers the announced pet in that month, they will also receive other exclusive items.

Criticism 

 Parents have raised concerns regarding children's use and potential overuse of the Webkinz toys.
 Some parents have voiced concerns about the website's online chat system. The chat system, known as KinzChat, has various safety precautions. These include placing restrictions on who can send messages, and disallowing users to type; opting for a "safe-chat" system wherein users can only post pre-written phrases from a list. 
 Some schools have expressed concern about the toys becoming a distraction from education. This has occasionally resulted in Webkinz being banned from school grounds.
 Some users voiced criticism when the once advertisement-free site  began displaying advertisements, previously only for their own additional game-related products, but now also for movies, such as Alvin and the Chipmunks and Bee Movie. Due to this, an option was created that members can use to block advertisements promoting content that is not sponsored by or affiliated with Webkinz or Ganz. However, if enabled, this option cannot be changed until 30 days have passed.
 In 2007, rumors spread about a character that would kill Webkinz on the site, supposedly inserted by a disgruntled employee or a rival site. These claims were proven false.

2020 data breach 
In April 2020, a hacker gained access to the login information of almost 23 million players, which was later leaked. Ganz later strengthened their encryption and required all users to reset their passwords.

References

External links 

 

2005 video games
Virtual pets
Children's websites
Virtual world communities
Stuffed toys
Toy animals
Internet properties established in 2005
Products introduced in 2005
2000s toys
2000s fads and trends
Video games developed in Canada
Massively multiplayer online games